Gonzalo Hinojal Neila (born 14 April 1986), sometimes known simply as Gonzalo, is a Spanish professional footballer who plays as a central defender.

Club career
Hinojal was born in Béjar, Salamanca, Castile and León. A UD Salamanca youth graduate, he made his debuts as a senior with the reserves in the 2005–06 campaign, in Tercera División.

In the 2007 summer, after a spell at UD Santa Marta, Hinojal first arrived in Segunda División B, after agreeing to a contract with CD Guijuelo. In August of the following year he moved to fellow league team Zamora CF.

In 2009 Hinojal joined Terrassa FC, also in the third tier. On 27 July 2010, after appearing rarely, he signed for GCE Villaralbo in the fourth division.

On 18 July 2012 Hinojal returned to Guijuelo. On 16 August of the following year he moved abroad for the first time in his career, signing for Indian I-League side Sporting Clube de Goa.

Hinojal made his professional debut for the side on 21 September 2013, playing the full 90 minutes in a 1–1 home draw against Mumbai FC. He appeared in 22 matches during the campaign, as his side finished fifth.

On 5 August 2014, already as a free agent, Hinojal returned to the chacineros. On 16 July of the following year he moved to CF Talavera de la Reina.

Career statistics

References

External links

1986 births
Living people
People from Béjar
Sportspeople from the Province of Salamanca
Spanish footballers
Footballers from Castile and León
Association football defenders
Segunda División B players
Tercera División players
CD Guijuelo footballers
Zamora CF footballers
Terrassa FC footballers
CF Talavera de la Reina players
CD Móstoles URJC players
I-League players
Sporting Clube de Goa players
Spanish expatriate footballers
Spanish expatriate sportspeople in India
Expatriate footballers in India